Chutney is an Indian short film written by  Tisca Chopra and directed by Jyoti Kapur Das, co-written by Avneesh Mishra and Jyoti Kapur Das. The story is situated at Model Town where Vanita played by Tisca Chopra is shown narrating a tale to a woman who, the night before, flirts with her husband at a party. The story is sweet, and spicy, just like Chutney. It is produced by Tisca Chopra; starring Adil Hussain, Tisca Chopra and  Rasika Dugal. Additional cast- Sumit Gulati, Devesh Ranjan and Aakash Bharadwaj.

References

External links
 

2010s Hindi-language films
2016 films
Indian short films